"Hearts of Stone" is a rhythm and blues song.

Hearts of Stone may also refer to:

 Hearts of Stone (Southside Johnny and the Asbury Jukes album), 1978
 Hearts of Stone (Stoneground album), 1978
 Hearts of Stone (Doctor Who), a Doctor Who short story
 The Witcher 3: Wild Hunt – Hearts of Stone, a 2015 video game expansion for The Witcher 3

See also 
 Heart of Stone (disambiguation)